Ramón Carlos Montaño Córdova (born November 8, 1982) is a Mexican professional boxer.

Professional career
After dropping Dmitriy Salita in the first round, their bout would end in a very disputed draw. He would then lose a very close decision to David Diaz.

On October 15, 2010, Montaño lost to undefeated Frankie Gomez in Indio, California.

Ramón's next fight will be against undefeated Jesse Vargas on the undercard of Amir Khan vs. Marcos Maidana.

MMA
Ramon Montano is also one of Las Vegas' top most prolific trainers in the MMA arena. He currently also trains various celebrities and is in the midst of opening his personal gym.

References

External links

Boxers from Sonora
People from Ciudad Obregón
Light-welterweight boxers
1982 births
Living people
Mexican male boxers